Steinernema is a genus of nematodes in the family of Steinernematidae. The genus Steinernema is named after the nematologist Gotthold Steiner.

Life cycle 
Species form symbiotic relationships with Xenorhabdus and Photorhabdus bacteria. The free-living third stage juvenile, termed a dauer juvenile, enters its insect hosts through natural openings, such as the mouth, anus, and spiracles. 

Bacterial cells from the intestines are regurgitated into the insect. The insect hemolymph provides a rich medium for the bacterial cells which grow, releasing toxins and exoenzymes, causing the insect host to die from septicemia. The bacteria also produce other compounds to protect the insect from other microbes in the soil.

The nematode moves out of its developmentally arrested third, nonfeeding stage, triggered by either bacterial or insect food signals. The nematodes feed on the bacteria and moult to the fourth stage, reaching adulthood within a few days. with separate male and female individuals. Nematode development continues for two to three generations. When insufficient nutrient remain adult development is suppressed. Developmentally arrested third stage juveniles accumulate and emerge into the soil, where they may survive for months until a new suitable host is found.

Species 
The following species have been described:

Use in agriculture 
Species of this genus can infect insects and are used as a biopesticide to infect agricultural pests. They can be used against a wide variety of species, including weevils, cutworms, gnats and mole crickets.

References

Further reading
 
 
 

Rhabditida
Rhabditida genera